"(I Just Want It) To Be Over" is a song by American singer Keyshia Cole. It was written by the singer along with Alicia Keys, Taniesha Smith, and Kerry "Krucial" Brothers for her debut album, The Way It Is (2005). Production on the song was helmed by the latter. Released on April 5, 2005 as the album's second single, "(I Just Want It) To Be Over" became a moderate success on the US Billboard Hot R&B/Hip-Hop Songs chart, peaking at number 30.  It also reached number one on the Bubbling Under Hot 100 Singles chart, which acts as an extension to the Hot 100.

Music video
A music video for "(I Just Want It) To Be Over" was directed by Benny Boom. It starts with Cole sitting on a bed, singing the first verse. She tries numerous times to escape the room she is locked in. She then breaks a mirror with a chair and steps through the mirror frame. The next scene shows broken glass on the floor. Cole is then seen wearing a sun dress. As she walks down a hall she sees a man and two women in the room; when she approaches the next room she spots a man and a woman arguing. Cole walks into a nightclub in a black tank top and mini skirt, and performs the song with a band. The video ends by showing a montage of the preceding events.

Track listings

Credits and personnel 
Credits adapted from the liner notes of The Way It Is.

Kerry "Krucial" Brothers – producer, writer
Keyshia Cole – writer
Ron Fair – additional vocal producer
Alicia Keys – vocal producer, writer
Dave Pensado – mixing engineer
Taniesha Smith – writer

Charts

References

2005 singles
Keyshia Cole songs
Music videos directed by Benny Boom
Songs written by Kerry Brothers Jr.
2005 songs
Songs written by Keyshia Cole
Songs written by Alicia Keys
A&M Records singles